QDPR (quinoid dihydropteridine reductase) is a human gene that produces the enzyme quinoid dihydropteridine reductase. This enzyme is part of the pathway that recycles a substance called tetrahydrobiopterin, also known as BH4. Tetrahydrobiopterin works with an enzyme called phenylalanine hydroxylase to process a substance called phenylalanine. Phenylalanine is an amino acid (a building block of proteins) that is obtained through the diet; it is found in all proteins and in some artificial sweeteners. When tetrahydrobiopterin interacts with phenylalanine hydroxylase, tetrahydrobiopterin is altered and must be recycled to a usable form. The regeneration of this substance is critical for the proper processing of several other amino acids in the body. Tetrahydrobiopterin also helps produce certain chemicals in the brain called neurotransmitters, which transmit signals between nerve cells.

The QDPR gene is located on the short (p) arm of chromosome 4 at position 15.31, from base pair 17,164,291 to base pair 17,189,981.

In melanocytic cells QDPR gene expression may be regulated by MITF.

Related conditions
Mutations in the QDPR gene are a common cause of tetrahydrobiopterin deficiency. More than 30 disorder-causing mutations in this gene have been identified, including aberrant splicing, amino acid substitutions, insertions, or premature terminations. These mutations completely, or almost completely, inactivate quinoid dihydropteridine reductase, which prevents the normal recycling of tetrahydrobiopterin. In the absence of usable tetrahydrobiopterin, the body cannot process phenylalanine correctly. As a result, phenylalanine from the diet builds up in the bloodstream and other tissues and can lead to brain damage. Neurotransmitters in the brain are also affected, resulting in delayed development, seizures, movement disorders, and other symptoms.

In addition, a reduction in the activity of quinoid dihydropteridine reductase may cause calcium to build up abnormally in certain parts of the brain, resulting in damage to nerve cells.

References

Sources

Further reading

External links
 
 Tetrahydrobiopterin Homepage